By the arrangements of the Canadian federation, the Canadian monarchy operates in Prince Edward Island as the core of the province's Westminster-style parliamentary democracy. As such, the Crown within Prince Edward Island's jurisdiction is referred to as the Crown in Right of Prince Edward Island, His Majesty in Right of Prince Edward Island, or the King in Right of Prince Edward Island. The Constitution Act, 1867, however, leaves many royal duties in Prince Edward Island specifically assigned to the sovereign's viceroy, the lieutenant governor of Prince Edward Island, whose direct participation in governance is limited by the conventional stipulations of constitutional monarchy.

Constitutional role

The role of the Crown is both legal and practical; it functions in Prince Edward Island in the same way it does in all of Canada's other provinces, being the centre of a constitutional construct in which the institutions of government acting under the sovereign's authority share the power of the whole. It is thus the foundation of the executive, legislative, and judicial branches of the province's government.

The Canadian monarch—since 8 September 2022, King Charles III—is represented and his duties carried out by the lieutenant governor of Prince Edward Island, whose direct participation in governance is limited by the conventional stipulations of constitutional monarchy, with most related powers entrusted for exercise by the elected parliamentarians, the ministers of the Crown generally drawn from amongst them, and the judges and justices of the peace. The Crown today primarily functions as a guarantor of continuous and stable governance and a nonpartisan safeguard against the abuse of power. This arrangement began with an 1873 order-in-council by Queen Victoria and continued an unbroken line of monarchical government extending back to the early 16th century. However, though Prince Edward Island has a separate government headed by the King, as a province, Prince Edward Island is not itself a kingdom.

Government House in Charlottetown is owned by the sovereign in his capacity as King in Right of Prince Edward Island and is used as an official residence by the lieutenant governor and sovereign; other members of the Canadian royal family will reside there when in Prince Edward Island. It is also where the Executive Council is sworn-in and honours are given to Prince Edward Islanders.

According to the Legislative Assembly's Members' Handbook, members are not permitted to speak "disrespectfully of the Queen, the royal family, the governor general, the
lieutenant governor, or the administrator of the province", as, "by their rank and position, they are entitled to respect from members." What constitutes unacceptable language "depends largely on circumstances". However, insults, obscene language, or questioning a royal or viceregal person's integrity, honesty, or character is disallowed.

Royal associations

Those in the royal family perform ceremonial duties when on a tour of the province; the royal persons do not receive any personal income for their service, only the costs associated with the exercise of these obligations are funded by both the Canadian and Prince Edward Island Crowns in their respective councils.

Monuments around Prince Edward Island mark some of those visits, while others honour a royal personage or event. Further, Prince Edward Island's monarchical status is illustrated by royal names applied regions, communities, schools, and buildings, many of which may also have a specific history with a member or members of the royal family; Prince Edward Island is itself named in honour of Prince Edward, Duke of Kent and Strathearn. Associations also exist between the Crown and many private organizations within the province; these may have been founded by a royal charter, received a royal prefix, and/or been honoured with the patronage of a member of the royal family. Examples include the Central Agricultural Society, which was under the patronage of Prince Albert, Prince Consort, after 1843.

The main symbol of the monarchy is the sovereign himself, his image (in portrait or effigy) thus being used to signify government authority. A royal cypher or crown may also illustrate the monarchy as the locus of authority, without referring to any specific monarch. Further, though the monarch does not form a part of the constitutions of Prince Edward Island's honours, they do stem from the Crown as the fount of honour and so bear on the insignia symbols of the sovereign.

History

What is today Prince Edward Island was discovered and claimed by John Cabot for King Henry VII, though it was later, in 1523, also claimed by Giovanni da Verrazzano for King Francis I, putting Île Saint-Jean, as Verrazzno called it, under the sovereignty of the French Crown until 1758. In that year, the French settlement of Louisbourg (in present-day Nova Scotia) fell to the British Royal Navy and, with the 1762 Treaty of Fontainbleau, sovereignty over the island was officially transferred by King Louis XV to King George III. In 1763, the Earl of Egmont presented an elaborate memorial to the King, asking that the Island of Saint John, while under the sovereignty of the Crown indefinitely, be granted to him and divided into baronies. George initially denied Egmont's request, but, after Egmont again presented his petition in 1767, the King this time approved. On 19 July 1769, Saint John Island was separated from the jurisdiction of Nova Scotia and became its own colony of the British Crown.

Prince Edward, George III's fourth son, arrived in Halifax, Nova Scotia, in 1794 and, while he never visited Saint John Island, he, as Commander-in-Chief of the British forces in North America, ordered that new barracks be built in Charlottetown and defences constructed to protect the harbour. Recognising the Prince's interest in the island, its legislature passed a bill on 1 February 1799 that changed the colony's name in honour of Edward. By 1843 construction of Province House was begun, and the laying of the cornerstone was followed by a Royal Salute and three cheers for Queen Victoria. Nhttps://en.wikipedia.org/wiki/Help:Introduction_to_referencing_with_Wiki_Markup/1ot four years later, the Legislative Assembly adopted an address to the Queen, asking for the establishment of responsible government in the colony, and the request was soon thereafter granted.

The Liberal Reform Party won the plurality of seats in the Legislative Assembly in 1850 and made responsible government a key goal. They faced opposition from Governor Ambrose Lane, but would not relent and the legislature "virtually went 'on strike'" the following year, voting non-confidence in the Cabinet and refusing to pass supply bills. The impasse was finally overcome when the Governor invited George Coles to form a PEI's first responsible government.

Queen Elizabeth II attended the 100th anniversary of Prince Edward Island's entry into Confederation.

In 2022, Prince Edward Island instituted a provincial Platinum Jubilee medal to mark the Queen's seventy years on the Canadian throne; the first time in Canada's history that a royal occasion was commemorated on provincial medals.

See also
 Symbols of Prince Edward Island
 Monarchy

References

External links
 
 

Prince Edward Island, Monarchy in
Politics of Prince Edward Island